The 1962 Kilkenny Senior Hurling Championship was the 68th staging of the Kilkenny Senior Hurling Championship since its establishment by the Kilkenny County Board.

On 19 August 1962, Bennetsbridge won the championship after a 5-07 to 2-08 defeat of Lisdowney in the final. It was their eighth championship title overall and their first title in two championship seasons.

Results

Final

References

Kilkenny Senior Hurling Championship
Kilkenny Senior Hurling Championship